Navoiy Region is one of the regions of Uzbekistan. It is located in the central north/northwest of the country. The Navoiy region borders with Kazakhstan, Samarqand Region, Buxoro Region, Jizzakh Region, and the Karakalpakstan Republic. The population is estimated 1,033,857 (2022), with 51% living in rural areas. The capital is Navoiy (pop. est. 146,900). The region and its capital are named after the poet Ali-Shir Nava'i.

The climate is a typically semi-desert continental climate. Navoiy region has significant natural resources, especially natural gas, petroleum, and precious metals, plus raw materials for construction. The region's economy is heavily dependent on large mining, metallurgical and chemical production complexes. The Navoi and Zarafshan mines produce some of the world's purest gold.

Leading agricultural products are cotton and Karakul sheep. Some 90% of the entire area is considered potentially rich agricultural land, if a source of water for irrigation can be located.

Administrative divisions

The Navoiy Region consists of 8 districts (listed below) and three district-level cities: Navoiy, Zarafshon and Gʻozgʻon.

There are 7 cities (Navoiy, Zarafshon, Gʻozgʻon, Qiziltepa, Nurota, Uchquduq, Yangirabod) and 46 urban-type settlements in the Navoiy Region.

Economy
Navoiy Region is located in the central part of Uzbekistan, being one of the largest industrial centres of the country. The region possesses rich minerals and raw materials resources – Muruntau gold-bearing field, silica sand fields (of more than 1.5 billion tons), deposits of granite (1.9 billion cubic meters), marble (420 million cubic meters), phosphorites (1.5 billion tons) and many others.

Navoiy Mining and Metallurgy Combinat – the biggest enterprise of the region, is included in top ten largest world producers of uranium and gold (9999 standard). Gold bars produced by the Combinat are awarded with the status of “optimal gold delivery” by London Precious Metals Market and Tokyo Commodities Exchange. Along with mining, the region’s economy is based on production of building materials, chemical, textile and food industries.

40 foreign investment enterprises operate in Navoiy Region. Most of them are established with participation of investors from USA, China, Russia and the United Kingdom – Uzbek-British Joint Venture “Amantaytau-Goldfields” is successfully working in the region.

In 2019 the entire region was made a "free economic zone" by presidential decree.

References

External links
 

 
Regions of Uzbekistan